Limnonectes deinodon is a species of fanged frogs in the family Dicroglossidae. It is endemic to peninsular Malaysia and likely also southern Thailand. It was previously confused with Limnonectes laticeps and Limnonectes khasianus.

References

 
http://research.amnh.org/vz/herpetology/amphibia/Amphibia/Anura/Dicroglossidae/Dicroglossinae/Limnonectes/Limnonectes-deinodon

deinodon
Amphibians of Malaysia
Amphibians described in 2014